Deli Tua is a town and administrative district within Deli Serdang Regency of North Sumatra province of Indonesia. It covers an area of 9.36 km2, and had a population of 60,624 at the 2010 Census. It lies immediately south of Medan city, of which it is effectively a suburb. The district comprises six administrative "villages", listed below with their populations in 2010:

 Deli Tua (12,748)
 Deli Tua Timur (East Deli Tua) (6,823)
 Deli Tua Barat (West Deli Tua) (8,202)
 Mekar Sari (10,313)
 Kedai Durian (11,315)
 Suka Makmur (11,223)

The weather conditions in Deli Tua are hot and cloudy, with a temperature range of 74 to 90 degrees fahrenheit (~23 to ~32 celsius). The month with the least turbulent weather on average is February, and on the contrary the most overcast month is October. The wet season in Deli Tua lasts from mid August to the end of December, the dry season being the remaining months. During October the town sees approx. 10 inches of rain. Humidity levels stay at nearly 100% throughout the year. Daylight in Deli Tua stays consistent, right around 12 hours a day for most of the year.

References 

North Sumatra

External Links